This is a list of famous or notable people from were either born or resided in the English county of Hampshire:

A
Edward Abraham, biochemist, was born in Shirley
James Acton, cricketer, was born in Southampton
Fanny Adams, murder victim, was born in Alton
James Adams, cricketer, was born in Winchester
Rick Adams, broadcaster, was born in Winchester
Adamski, Adam Tinley, music producer, was born in Lymington
William Adelin, prince, was born in Winchester
Æthelwold of Winchester, bishop, was born in Winchester
Ben Ainslie, yachtsman, was raised in Lymington
Ben Mansfield, actor, born in Romsey
Holly Aird, actor, was born in Aldershot
Bill Albury, footballer, was born in Portsmouth
Richard Aldington, poet, was born in Portsmouth
Michael Alexander, diplomat, was born in Winchester
Alfie Allen, actor, was born in Portsmouth
Anthony Allen, rugby union player, was born in Southampton
Christopher Allen, cricketer, was born in Southampton
Mabel Alleyne, wood engraver, was born in Southampton
James Alms, naval commander, was born in Gosport
Richard Altham, cricketer, was born in Winchester
Charles Ambler, footballer, was born in Alverstoke
Charlie Amesbury, rugby union player, was born in Portsmouth
Linda Amos, swimmer, was born in Portsmouth
Bob Anderson, darts player, was born in Winchester
Bob Anderson, fencer, was born in Gosport
Diana Anderson, midwife, was born in Portsmouth
Darren Anderton, footballer, was born in Southampton
Cecil Andrews, footballer, was born in Alton
Percy Andrews, footballer, was born in Alton
Richard Andrews, industrialist, was born in Bishops Sutton
Manny Andruszewski, footballer, was born in Eastleigh
John Antrobus, playwright, was born in Aldershot
 Kirsty Applebaum, children's author
Aqualung, singer, was born in Southampton
Alexander Dundas Young Arbuthnott, naval commander, was born in Forton
Geoffrey Arbuthnot, naval commander, was born in Havant
Edward Archdale, sailor, was born in Portsmouth
Les Archer, motorcycle racer, was born in Aldershot
John Arlott, sports commentator, was born in Basingstoke
Maxwell Armfield, painter, was born in Ringwood
Richard Arthur, politician, was born in Aldershot
Arthur Atherley, politician, was born in Southampton
Sam Attwater, actor, was born in Basingstoke
Aubrey, music producer, was raised in Portsmouth
Juliet Aubrey, actor, was born in Fleet
Claude Auchinleck, army commander, was born in Aldershot
Cassandra Austen, painter, was born in Steventon
Charles Austen, naval commander, was born in Steventon
Francis Austen, naval commander, was born in Steventon
Jane Austen, novelist, was born in Steventon
Danny Axford, cyclist, was born in Winchester
Wilbert Awdry, novelist, was born in Ampfield
John Ayliffe, jurist, was born in Pember
Jon Ayling, cricketer, was born in Portsmouth
Hertha Marks Ayrton, engineer, was born in Portsea, Portsmouth

B
James Bailey, politician, was born in Ropley
Jim Bailey, cricketer, was born in Otterbourne
Donald Baker, bishop, was born in Portsmouth
Graham Baker, footballer, was born in Southampton
Rae Baker, footballer, was born in Southampton
Richard St. Barbe Baker Founder of the International Tree Foundation, born in West End
Tom Baker, clergyman, was born in Southampton
William Morrant Baker, physician, was born in Andover
Clare Balding, presenter, was born in Kingsclere
William Baldock, cricketer, was born in Chilworth
Herbert Baldwin, cricketer, was born in Hartley Wintney
Peter Baldwin, politician, was born in Aldershot
Nicky Banger, footballer, was born in Southampton
David Banks, cricketer, was born in Southampton
Carl Barât, guitarist, was born in Basingstoke
Chris Barfoot, actor, was born in Southampton
George Barfoot, cricketer, was born in Twyford
Stuart Barfoot, footballer, was born in Southampton
Peter Barlow, footballer, was born in Portsmouth
Joseph Osmond Barnard, engraver, was born in Portsmouth
Mike Barnard, cricketer, was born in Portsmouth
James Barnes, television director, was born in Portsmouth
Nora Stanton Blatch Barney, civil engineer, was born in Basingstoke
Peter Barrett, cricketer, was born in Winchester
Laurence D. Barron, chemist, was born in Southampton
Edward Dodsley Barrow, politician, was born in Ringwood
Martin Barry, physician, was born in Fratton
Kevin Bartlett, footballer, was born in Portsmouth
Emma Barton, actor, was born in Portsmouth
Charles Barton, cricketer, was born in Sherfield English
Victor Barton, cricketer, was born in Hound
Steve Basham, footballer, was born in Southampton
Geeta Basra, actor, was born in Portsmouth
Justin Bates, cricketer, was born in Farnborough
Elizabeth Bather, police officer, was born in Winchester
Mike Batt, music producer, was born in Southampton
Tim Battersby, composer, was born in Fleet
Henry Beagley, cricketer, was born in Alton
John Beagley, cricketer, was born in Alton
Daniel Marcus William Beak, naval commander, was born in Southampton
George Beare, footballer, was born in Shirley Warren
Don Beauman, racing driver, was born in Farnborough
Julia Beckett, swimmer, was born in Winchester
Tony Beckley, actor, was born in Southampton
George Bell, theologian, was born in Hayling Island
Kelly Bell, model, was born in Aldershot
John Belling, geneticist, was born in Aldershot
Francis Benali, footballer, was born in Southampton
Russell Bencraft, cricketer, was born in Southampton
Paul Bennett, footballer, was born in Southampton
Peter B. Bennett, anaesthesiologist, was born in Portsmouth
Godfrey Benson, politician, was born in New Alresford
Graham Benstead, footballer, was born in Aldershot
Bernhard Bentinck, cricketer, was born in South Warnborough
Eugene Bernard, footballer, was born in Southampton
Amelle Berrabah, singer, was born in Aldershot
Cyril Berry, winemaker, was raised in Andover
Johnny Berry, footballer, was born in Aldershot
Walter Besant, novelist, was born in Portsmouth
Scott Bevan, footballer, was born in Southampton
Billy Bevis, footballer, was born in Warsash
Bevis of Hampton, legendary hero, was born in Southampton
Alexander William Bickerton, physicist, was born in Alton
George Biddlecombe, naval surveyor, was born in Portsea, Portsmouth
Thomas Bilson, bishop, was born in Winchester
Henry Bird, chess player, was born in Portsea, Portsmouth
Birdy, singer, was born in Lymington
Denise Black, actor, was born in Emsworth
Roger Black, athlete, was born in Gosport
Kenneth Blackburne, colonial governor, was born in Bordon
Ronnie Blackman, footballer, was born in Portsmouth
David Blake, cricketer, was born in Havant
John Blake, cricketer, was born in Portsmouth
Thomas Blakiston, naturalist, was born in Lymington
Helena Blackman, actor, was born in Southampton
Frederick Blundell, cricketer, was born in South Stoneham
Gary Bond, actor, was born in Alton
Ronnie Bond, drummer, was born in Andover
John Bonham-Carter, politician, was born in Portsmouth
Lothian Bonham-Carter, cricketer, was born in Adhurst St Mary
Emma Bonney, billiards player, was born in Portsmouth
Cecil Bouchier, pilot, was born in Fleet
Lionel Bowen, footballer, was born in Southampton
Marjorie Bowen, novelist, was born in Hayling Island
Judi Bowker, actor, was born in Shawford
John Boxall, clergyman, was born in Bramshott
Ken Boyes, footballer, was born in Southampton
Stuart Boyes, cricketer, was born in Southampton
A.V. Bramble, actor, was born in Portsmouth
Thomas Bramsdon, politician, was born in Portsea, Portsmouth
John Bray, communications engineer, was born in Fratton
Noel Brett, cricketer, was born in Aldershot
Frederick Lee Bridell, painter, was born in Southampton
Wayne Bridge, footballer, was born in Southampton
Henry Bromfield, politician, was born in South Stoneham
William Arnold Bromfield, botanist, was born in Boldre
Robert Brooke, colonial governor, was born in Southampton
Jeremy Brooks, novelist, was born in Southampton
Joe Brooks, singer, was born in Southampton
Arthur Brough, actor, was born in Petersfield
Bob Brown, footballer, was born in Southampton
Jason "J" Brown, singer, was born in Aldershot
John Brown, cricketer, was born in Warblington
Kevan Brown, footballer, was born in Andover
Laurie Brown, bishop, was born in Basingstoke
Peter Brown, footballer, was born in Andover
Wayne Brown, footballer, was born in Southampton
Tom Browne, broadcaster, was born in Lymington
Donovan Browning, footballer, was born in Ashley
Isambard Kingdom Brunel, engineer, was born in Portsea, Portsmouth
Iain Brunnschweiler, cricketer, was born in Southampton
Charles Brutton, cricketer, was born in Southsea
Nick Buchanan, cricketer, was born in Basingstoke
Bill Buck, cricketer, was born in Portswood
Hugh Buckler, actor, was born in Southampton
Charles Budden, cricketer, was born in Fareham
James Budden, cricketer, was born in Bevois Town
John Bulbeck, cricketer, was born in Havant
Mervyn Burden, cricketer, was born in Southampton
Thomas Burgess, bishop, was born in Odiham
Geoffrey Burgon, composer, was born in Hambledon
Frank Burnell-Nugent, cricketer, was born in Sherborne St John
Andy Burrows, drummer, was born in Winchester
Tom Burrows, footballer, was born in Portsmouth
Alan Burton, footballer, was born in Aldershot
Charles Butler, novelist, was born in Romsey
George Edmund Butler, painter, was born in Southampton
Martin Butler, composer, was born in Romsey
Thomas Adair Butler, soldier, was born in Soberton
Len Butt, footballer, was born in Freemantle
John Button, politician, was born in Buckland
John Button, politician, was born in Buckland
James Bye, actor, was born in Basingstoke
Arthur Byng, cricketer, was born in Southsea

C
David Calder, actor, was born in Portsmouth
Henry Calder, cricketer, was born in South Stoneham
Oliver "Olli" Caldwell, Formula 2 driver.
James Callaghan, politician, was born in Copnor
Isabella Calthorpe, actor, was born in Winchester
Douglas Cameron, pilot, was born in Southampton
Alastair Campbell, cricketer, was born in South Stoneham
Alec Campbell, footballer, was born in Southampton
John Candy, pilot, was born in Froyle
Victor Cannings, cricketer, was born in Bighton
Mornington Cannon, jockey, was born in Houghton
Noel Capon, academic, was born in Southampton
Matt Cardle, singer, was born in Southampton
Arthur Carlisle, bishop, was born in Portsmouth
Laura Carmichael, actor, was born in Southampton
Harry Carpenter, bishop, was born in Liss
George Carter, cricketer, was born in Warblington
James Carter, judge, was born in Portsmouth
Stuart Bonham Carter, naval officer, was born in Portsmouth
Donald Cartridge, cricketer, was born in Sholing
Richard Carty, cricketer, was born in Southampton
George Case, cricketer, was born in Fareham
Louise Casey, government adviser, was born in Portsmouth
Raquel Cassidy, actor, was born in Fleet
Sid Castle, footballer, was born in Basingstoke
Vito Cataffo, restaurateur, was raised in Southampton
Bob Catley, singer, was born in Aldershot
Stuart Catterall, cricketer, was born in Southampton
Ronald Cavaye, pianist, was born in Aldershot
Kathryn Cave, novelist, was born in Aldershot
Christopher Cazenove, actor, was born in Winchester
Maureen Chadwick, screenwriter and dramatist, was born in Aldershot 
Garry Chalk, actor, was born in Southampton
Norman Chalk, footballer, was born in Bitterne
Basil Hall Chamberlain, linguist, was born in Southsea
Houston Stewart Chamberlain, philosopher, was born in Southsea
Will Champion, drummer, was born in Southampton
Arthur Bertram Chandler, novelist, was born in Aldershot
Richard Chandler, antiquary, was born in Elson
John Worthy Chaplin, soldier, was born in Ramsdell
Bill Charlton, footballer, was born in South Stoneham
Ernle Chatfield, naval commander, was born in Southsea
Mary Cheke, lady of the privy chamber, courtier poet, epigrammatist, was born in Hampshire
Kara Chesworth, cyclist, was born in Portsmouth
David Chidgey, politician, was born in Basingstoke
Thomas Chignell, cricketer, was born in Havant
Robert L. Chidlaw-Roberts, pilot, was born in Winchester
Chris Chittell, actor, was born in Aldershot
Ian Chivers, cricketer, was born in Southampton
Martin Chivers, footballer, was born in Southampton
Chris T-T, singer, was born in Winchester
Cecil Christmas, footballer, was born in Southampton
Charles Chubb, locksmith, was born in Fordingbridge
Alexa Chung, model, was born in Privett
Hedley Churchward, painter, was born in Aldershot
Steve Claridge, football manager, was born in Portsmouth
Clive Clark, golfer, was born in Winchester
Andrew Clarke, colonial governor, was born in Southsea
Alasdair Clayre, singer, was born in Southampton
Montagu Cleeve, music teacher, was born in Southsea
William Clement, cricketer
Stan Clements, footballer, was born in Portsmouth
Tom Cleverley, footballer, was born in Basingstoke
Basil Coad, general, was born in Portsmouth
Charles Cobbe, archbishop, was born in Swarraton
Denise Coffey, actor, was born in Aldershot
Peter Coke, actor, was born in Southsea
John Colborne, colonial governor, was born in Lyndhurst
Bill Coldwell, football manager, was born in Petersfield
Marilyn Cole, model, was born in Portsmouth
Norman Cole, footballer, was born in Southampton
Andrew Collins, cricketer, was born in Andover
Darren Collins, footballer, was born in Winchester
Richard Collins, painter, was born in Gosport
Alan Comfort, footballer, was born in Aldershot
Hugh Constantine, air force commander, was born in Southsea
Andy Cook, footballer, was born in Romsey
Pam Cook, film historian, was born in Farnborough
George Costigan, actor, was born in Portsmouth
Alexander Cowie, cricketer, was born in Lymington
Darren Cowley, cricketer, was born in Winchester
William Cowper, anatomist, was born in Petersfield
Walter Cox, footballer, was born in Southampton
William Denton Cox, steward, was born in Southampton
Lol Coxhill, saxophonist, was born in Portsmouth
Ray Crawford, footballer, was born in Portsmouth
Stan Cribb, footballer, was born in Gosport
Thomas Crimble, cricketer, was born in Overton
N. J. Crisp, dramatist, was born in Southampton
Tom Croft, rugby union player, was born in Basingstoke
Edmund Crofts, cricketer, was born in Winchester
Alex Cropley, footballer, was born in Aldershot
Ian Crosby, cricketer, was born in Aldershot
Matt Crossley, footballer, was born in Basingstoke
Noel Croucher, businessman and philanthropist
Philip Crowley, entomologist, was born in Alton
Jon Cruddas, politician, was raised in Waterlooville
George Cull, cricketer, was born in Lymington
Barry Cunliffe, archaeologist, was raised in Portsmouth
Bessie Cursons, actor, was born in Portsmouth
Henry Curtis, sailor, was born in Romsey
William Curtis, botanist, was born in Alton

D
Ranulph Dacre, merchant, was born in Owslebury
Liam Daish, footballer, was born in Portsmouth
Richard Dalton, cricketer, was born in Portsmouth
Guy Daly, cricketer, was born in Bramley
Sid Daniels, mariner, was born in Portsmouth
Alex Danson, field hockey player, was born in Southampton
James Darby, cricketer, was born in Fareham
Ian Darke, sports commentator, was born in Portsmouth
Julia Darling, novelist, was born in Winchester
George Darvill, pilot, was born in Petersfield
Craig David, singer, was born in Southampton
Arthur Lumley Davids, orientalist, born in Hampshire
Harold Davidson, clergyman, was born in Hound
Emily Davies, suffragist, was born in Southampton
Libby Davies, politician, was born in Aldershot
Samantha Davies, yachtswoman, was born in Portsmouth
Walter Davis, botanist, was born in Amport
Richard Dawson, actor, was born in Gosport
George Fiott Day, sailor, was born in Southampton
Adam de Gurdon, knight, was born in Alton
Geoffrey de Havilland, test pilot, was born in Kingsclere
Robbe de Hert, film director, was born in Farnborough
William de Meones, judge, was born in East Meon
Thomas Dean, cricketer, was born in Gosport
George Deane, cricketer, was born in Bighton
Nick Dear, playwright, was born in Portsmouth
Alfred Denning, judge, was born in Whitchurch
Harry Dennis, footballer, was born in Romsey
Charles Dibdin, songwriter, was born in Southampton
William Dible, cricketer, was born in Southampton
Charles Dickens, novelist, was born in Landport
Jimmy Dickinson, footballer, was born in Alton
Edward Didymus, footballer, was born in Portsmouth
Kirsty Dillon, actor, was born in Portsmouth
Charlie Dimmock, gardener, was born in Southampton
Thomas Dingley, antiquary, was born in Southampton
William Dodd, cricketer, was born in Steep
Sean Doherty, footballer, was born in Basingstoke
Arthur Dominy, footballer, was born in South Stoneham
Daisy Dormer, singer, was born in Portsmouth
Aman Dosanj, footballer, was born in Southampton
Sarah Doucette, politician, was born in Winchester
Howard Douglas, general, was born in Gosport
Peter John Douglas, naval commander, was born in Portsmouth
Harry Downer, cricketer, was born in Southampton
Ted Drake, footballer, was born in Southampton
Paul Draper, cricketer, was born in Southampton
Frederick Drew, geologist, was born in Southampton
Samuel Rolles Driver, theologian, was born in Southampton
Henry Drummond, religious leader, was born in Northington
Nicola Duffett, actor, was born in Portsmouth
John Duigan, film director, was born in Hartley Wintney
Edmund Dummer, shipbuilder, was born in North Stoneham
Richard Dummer, colonist, was born in Bishopstoke
Arthur Duncan, cricketer, was born in Southampton
Dunbar Duncan, cricketer, was born in Southampton
Bill Newton Dunn, politician, was born in Greywell
Eric Dunn, air marshall, was born in Winchester
John Freeman Dunn, politician, was born in Basingstoke
John Charles Durant, politician, was born in Fordingbridge
Ralph Dutton, gardener, was born in Hinton Ampner
Bert Dyer, footballer, was born in Portsmouth

E
Pat Earles, footballer, was born in Titchfield
Michael East, athlete, was born in Portsmouth
David Easter, actor, was born in Eastleigh
Mark Easton, journalist, was raised in Winchester
Harry Eckett, e-sports player, was raised in Kings Somborne
John Ecton, tithe collector, was born in Winchester
Ernie Edds, footballer, was born in Portsmouth
Edward Lee Ede, cricketer, was born in Itchen
Edward Murray Charles Ede, cricketer, was born in Southampton
George Ede, cricketer, was born in Itchen
Kate Edmondson, broadcaster, was born in Portsmouth
Matt Edmondson, broadcaster, was born in Portsmouth
Spike Edney, keyboard player, was born in Portsmouth
Emma Edwards, politician, was born in Portsmouth
Bill Ellerington, footballer, was born in Southampton
Edward Elliot-Square, cricketer, was born in Winchester
Albert Elliott, rugby union player, was born in Southampton
Wade Elliott, footballer, was born in Eastleigh
Christopher Elrington, historian, was born in Farnborough
Charles Isaac Elton, barrister, was born in Southampton
Gareth Emery, music producer, was born in Southampton
Arthur English, actor, was born in Aldershot
Edward Evans, theologian, was born in West Meon
Ralph Evans, cricketer, was born in Newtown
Eamon Everall, painter, was born in Aldershot
John Ewbank, songwriter, was born in Eastleigh

F
Bob Fairman, footballer, was born in Southampton
Brett Fancy, actor, was born in Portsmouth
Harry Warner Farnall, politician, was born in Burley
Richard Faulds, sport shooter, was raised in Longparish
John Favour, theologian, was born in Southampton
Sam Fay, railwayman, was born in Hamble le Rice
John Feaver, tennis player, was born in Fleet
J. W. C. Fegan, altruist, was born in Southampton
Edward Stephen Fogarty Fegen, naval commander, was born in Southsea
Walter Feltham, cricketer, was born in Ringwood
Ronald Ferguson, polo player, was raised in Dummer
Albert Fielder, cricketer, was born in Sarisbury Green
Colin Fielder, footballer, was born in Winchester
Walter Fielder, cricketer, was born in Fareham
George Rudolf Hanbury Fielding, soldier, was born in Twyford
Susannah Fielding, actor, was raised in Havant
Anne Finch, poet, was born in Sydmonton
Colin Firth, actor, was born in Grayshott
Frances Fisher, actor, was born in Milford on Sea
Rosa Frederica Baring FitzGeorge, socialite, was born in West Tytherley
Desmond Fitzpatrick, general, was born in Aldershot
Henry Fitzroy, cricketer, was born in Southampton
Ray Flacke, guitarist, was born in Milford on Sea
Aaron Flahavan, footballer, was born in Southampton
Darryl Flahavan, footballer, was born in Southampton
Thomas Fletcher, poet, was born in Avington
Walter Flight, mineralogist, was born in Winchester
Darren Flint, cricketer, was born in Basingstoke
Gerald Flood, actor, was born in Portsmouth
Raymond Flood, cricketer, was born in Northam
James Foad, rower, was born in Southampton
Henry Foot, cricketer, was born in Romsey
Mark Foran, footballer, was born in Aldershot
Charles John Forbes, politician, was born in Gosport
Julia Fordham, singer, was born in Portsmouth
Darren Foreman, footballer, was born in Southampton
Philippa Forrester, broadcaster, was born in Winchester
Harold Forster, cricketer, was born in Winchester
Charles Forward, cricketer, was born in Romsey
Francis Foster, cricketer, was born in Havant
Steve Foster, footballer, was born in Portsmouth
Thomas Fox, cricketer, was born in Broughton
William Tilbury Fox, dermatologist, was born in Broughton
Mike Foyle, music producer, was born in Southampton
Harold Frank, painter, was born in Southampton
Martin Freeman, actor, was born in Aldershot
Brian Freemantle, novelist, was born in Southampton
Frederick Freemantle, cricketer, was born in Binley
Joe French, footballer, was born in Southampton
Henry Frere, cricketer, was born in Odiham
Brian Froud, illustrator, was born in Winchester
Stephen Fry, cricketer, was born in Portsmouth
Charles Fryatt, mariner, was born in Southampton
Jim Fryatt, footballer, was born in Southampton

G
David Gaiman, public relations officer, was born in Portsmouth
Neil Gaiman, novelist, was born in Portchester
Henry Gale, cricketer, was born in Winchester
Phil Gallie, politician, was born in Portsmouth
John Galpin, cricketer, was born in Alverstoke
Ted Galpin, businessman, was born in Portsmouth
Russell Garcia, field hockey player, was born in Portsmouth
Thomas Garnier, clergyman, was born in Bishopstoke
George Garrett, composer, was born in Winch
Joseph Garrett, YouTuber, stampylonghead, lives in Hampshire
Stephen Gaselee, judge, was born in Portsmouth
Steff Gaulter, weather forecaster, was born in Sway
Chris Geere, actor, was raised in Winchester
Pam Gems, playwright, was born in Bransgore
Helen Ghosh, civil servant, was born in Farnborough
Richard Gibbons, religious scholar, was born in Winchester
Edgar Gibson, bishop, was born in Fawley
William Gilbert, novelist, was born in Bishopstoke
Michael Giles, drummer, was born in Waterlooville
Peter Giles, bass guitarist, was born in Havant
John Gilpin, ballet dancer, was born in Southsea
Malcolm Gladwell, journalist, was born in Fareham
Murray Gold, composer, was born in Portsmouth
Alison Goldfrapp, singer, was raised in Alton
Ernest Spiteri Gonzi, footballer, was born in Aldershot
Josh Goodall, tennis player, was born in Basingstoke
Jim Goodchild, footballer, was born in Southampton
John Goodyer, botanist, was born in Alton
Johnny Gordon, footballer, was born in Portsmouth
Arthur Gore, tennis player, was born in Lyndhurst
Robert Vaughan Gorle, soldier, was born in Southsea
David Gorman, cricketer, was born in Havant
James Gornall, cricketer, was born in Farnborough
Andy Gosney, footballer, was born in Southampton
John Goss, composer, was born in Fareham
John Gother, priest, was born in Southampton
Stephen Gough, public nudity activist, was born in Eastleigh
Rupert Gould, horologist, was born in Southsea
Claude Grahame-White, aviator, was born in Bursledon
Thomas Tassell Grant, inventor, was born in Portsea, Portsmouth
Richard Granville, cricketer, was born in Kings Worthy
Andy Gray, footballer, was born in Southampton
Paul Gray, footballer, was born in Portsmouth
Simon Gray, playwright, was born in Hayling Island
Nicholas Greaves, clergyman, was born in Colemore
Chris Green, railwayman, was born in Winchester
Frederick Green, novelist, was born in Portsmouth
Judd Green, actor, was born in Portsmouth
Malcolm Green, chemist, was born in Eastleigh
George Greenfield, cricketer, was born in Winchester
Herbert Greenfield, politician, was born in Winchester
Carl Greenidge, cricketer, was born in Basingstoke
David Greetham, cricketer, was born in Liss
Jack Gregory, footballer, was born in Southampton
Maundy Gregory, political fixer, was born in Southampton
John Griffin, rugby union player, was born in Southampton
Phil Griggs, footballer, was born in Southampton
Frederick Gross, cricketer, was born in South Stoneham
Harriet Grote, biographer, was born in Southampton
Anthony Norris Groves, missionary, was born in Newton Valence
David Guard, cricketer, was born in Romsey
Chris Gubbey, businessman, was born in Gosport
Charles Gunner, cricketer, was born in Bishop's Waltham
John Gunner, cricketer, was born in Bishop's Waltham
Neil Gunter, cricketer, was born in Basingstoke
Steve Guppy, footballer, was born in Winchester
John Gurdon, biologist, was born in Dippenhall
Bernard Gutteridge, poet, was born in Southampton
May Gutteridge, social worker, was born in Gosport

H
David Habbin, opera singer, was born in Ringwood
James Hackman, murderer, was born in Gosport
Kevin Hague, politician, was born in Aldershot
David Haig, actor, was born in Aldershot
Clifford Hall, cricketer, was born in Breamore
Patrick Hall, cricketer, was born in Portsmouth
Robert Hall, cricketer, was born in Andover
Lewis Stratford Tollemache Halliday, soldier, was born in Medstead
John Halsted, naval commander, was born in Gosport
Lawrence Halsted, naval commander, was born in Gosport
Charles Powell Hamilton, naval commander, was born in Droxford
Mark Hamilton, guitarist, was raised in Alton
Stephen Hammond, politician, was born in Southampton
Mike Hancock, politician, was born in Portsmouth
Peter Hancock, bishop, was raised in Fareham
Jonathan Handley, naval commander, was born in Southsea
Terry Hands, theatre director, was born in Aldershot
St John Emile Clavering Hankin, playwright, was born in Southampton
John Hanlon, athlete, was born in Portsmouth
Antony Hansen, singer, was born in Southampton
Jonas Hanway, merchant, was born in Portsmouth
Francis Pym Harding, colonial governor, was born in Lymington
Israel Harding, sailor, was born in Portsmouth
William James Harding, photographer, was born in Southampton
Charles Hardy, naval commander, was born in Portsmouth
Jeremy Hardy, comedian, was born in Aldershot 
Lewis Harfield, cricketer, was born in Cheriton
Jane Harley, socialite, was born in Itchen Stoke
Toby Harnden, journalist, was born in Portsmouth
Frederick Harold, cricketer, was born in Eling
Pamela Harriman, diplomat, was born in Farnborough
Ashley Harris, footballer, was born in Purbrook
Benjamin Randell Harris, soldier, was born in Portsea, Portsmouth
Charles Harris, basketball player, was born in Southampton
Jack Harris, film editor, was born in South Farnborough
Keith Harris, ventriloquist, was born in Lyndhurst
Peter Harris, footballer, was born in Portsmouth
Steve Harris, novelist, was born in Basingstoke
Fred Harrison, footballer, was born in Winchester
William Henry Harrison, cricketer, was born in Nursling
Miranda Hart, actor, was raised in Petersfield
Donna Hartley-Wass, athlete, was born in Southampton
Henry Robinson Hartley, philanthropist, was born in Southampton
Mark Hartmann, footballer, was born in Southampton
Matthew Hartmann, footballer, was born in Southampton
Bill Harvey, footballer, was born in Shirley
Frank Harvey, cricketer, was born in Southampton
Nick Harvey, politician, was born in Chandler's Ford
Nikki Harvey, ten-pin bowler, was born in Southampton
Richard Harwood, cellist, was born in Portsmouth
Anthony Haswell, printer, was born in Portsmouth
Owen Hatherley, journalist, was born in Southampton
Lanoe Hawker, pilot, was born in Longparish
Paddy Haycocks, broadcaster, was born in Portsmouth
Brian Hayles, screenwriter, was born in Portsmouth
Rob Hayles, cyclist, was born in Portsmouth
Montague Hayter, cricketer, was born in Ringwood
Edwin Hazelton, cricketer, was born in Southampton
Allan Heath, cricketer, was born in East Woodhay
Mark Evelyn Heath, diplomat, was born in Emsworth
George Handel Heath-Gracie, organist, was born in Gosport
Trevor Hebberd, footballer, was born in Winchester
Nadia Hebson, painter, was born in Romsey
Heinz, singer, was raised in Eastleigh
Edward Hemsted, cricketer, was born in Whitchurch
Doug Henderson, footballer, was born in Southampton
David Heneker, composer, was born in Southsea
Janet Henfrey, actor, was born in Aldershot
Henry III of England, monarch, was born in Winchester
Bob Herman, cricketer, was born in Southampton
James Hibberd, cricketer, was born in Southampton
George Elgar Hicks, painter, was born in Lymington
George Hicks, trade unionist, was born in Vernhams Dean
Anthony Hill, cricketer, was born in Romsey Extra
Benny Hill, comedian, was born in Southampton
Derek Hill, painter, was born in Southampton
Georgiana Hill, cookery book writer, lived in Tadley
Gerry Hill, cricketer, was born in Totton
Harold Hillier, horticulturist, was born in Winchester
James Hillyar, naval commander, was born in Portsea, Portsmouth
Harold Hinde, cricketer, was born in Southsea
Richard Hindley, cricketer, was born in Portsmouth
John Hinton, footballer, was born in Southampton
Christopher Hitchens, journalist, was born in Portsmouth
Ernest Hoare, cricketer, was born in Upper Clatford
Joe Hoare, footballer, was born in Southampton
Philip Hoare, author, was born in Southampton
Carleton Hobbs, actor, was born in Farnborough
Jack Hobbs, footballer, was born in Portsmouth
John Raymond Hobbs, pathologist, was born in Aldershot
Charles Howard Hodges, painter, was born in Portsmouth
Roger Hodgson, singer, was born in Portsmouth
Lancelot Hogben, zoologist, was born in Portsmouth
Norman Douglas Holbrook, submariner, was born in Southsea
John Hold, footballer, was born in Southampton
Amanda Holden, actor, was born in Bishop's Waltham
Cedric Holland, naval commander, was born in Alverstoke
Henry Holland, cricketer, was born in Hartley Row
Maggie Holland, singer, was born in Alton
Ralph Hollins, naturalist, was born in Martin
Henry Holmes, cricketer, was born in Romsey
Nick Holmes, footballer, was born in Southampton
Arthur Holt, footballer, was born in Bitterne Park
Geoff Holt, yachtsman, was born in Portsmouth
Ernest George Horlock, soldier, was born in Alton
Bert Hoskins, football manager, was born in Southampton
Jon Hotten, author, was born in Aldershot
Brian Howard, footballer, was born in Winchester
Peter Howard, physician, was born in Aldershot
Brian Howe, singer, was born in Portsmouth
Kate Howey, judoka, was born in Andover
Mike Hugg, drummer, was born in Gosport
David Hughes, novelist, was born in Alton
Phil Hughes, cricketer, was born in Southampton
Walter Humphreys, cricketer, was born in Southsea
Dennis Hunt, footballer, was born in Portsmouth
Douglas Hunt, footballer, was born in Shipton Bellinger
Ralph Hunt, footballer, was born in Portsmouth
Stephen Hunt, footballer, was born in Southampton
Warren Hunt, footballer, was born in Portsmouth
Elizabeth Hurley, actress, model was born in Basingstoke
Hector Hurst, racing driver, was born in Lymington
Chris Hutchings, football manager, was born in Winchester
Steve Hutchings, footballer, was born in Portsmouth
Arthur Hutchins, footballer, was born in Bishop's Waltham
Peter Orlando Hutchinson, artist, was born in Winchester
Sam Hutsby, golfer, was born in Portsmouth
George Hyde, naval commander, was born in Southsea
Hector Hyslop, cricketer, was born in Southampton

I
Nelson Illingworth, sculptor, was born in Portsmouth
Danny Ings, footballer, was born in Winchester
Simon Ings, novelist, was born in Horndean
Robert Irving, conductor, was born in Winchester
Gwyther Irwin, abstract artist, was born in Basingstoke
Lionel Isherwood, cricketer, was born in Portsmouth

J
Frederick Jackman, cricketer, was born in Fareham
Alison Jackson, photographer, was born in Southsea
Charlotte Jackson, journalist, was born in Portsmouth
Joan Jackson, muse, was born in Farnborough
Joe Jackson, singer, was raised in Paulsgrove
Richard Downes Jackson, colonial administrator, was born in Petersfield
Edgar Jacob, bishop, was born in Crawley
Giles Jacob, literary critic, was born in Romsey
John James, architect, was raised in Basingstoke
Manley Angell James, soldier, was born in Odiham
Raji James, actor, was born in Portsmouth
William Milbourne James, naval commander, was born in Hartley Wintney
Robert Sympson Jameson, politician, was born in Harbridge
Waldemar Januszczak, art critic, was born in Basingstoke
Frank Jefferis, footballer, was born in Fordingbridge
Joanna Jeffrees, actor, was born in Winchester
Henry Jelf, cricketer, was born in Aldershot
Frederick Jellicoe, cricketer, was born in Southampton
John Jellicoe, naval commander, was born in Southampton
Albert Jenkin, rugby union player, was born in Ibsley
Alina Jenkins, broadcaster, was born in Eastleigh
Frank Jenner, evangelist, was born in Southampton
Sam Jepp, footballer, was born in Aldershot
Selwyn Jepson, novelist, was born in Farther Common
Belita Jepson-Turner, figure skater, was born in Nether Wallop
Robert Jesson, cricketer, was born in Southampton
Trevor Jesty, cricketer, was born in Gosport
Guy Jewell, cricketer, was born in Axford
Robin Johns, cricketer, was born in Southampton
Alexander Bryan Johnson, philosopher, was born in Gosport
Neil Johnson, film director, was born in Southampton
Claire Johnstone, footballer, was born in Portsmouth
Christian Jolley, footballer, was born in Fleet
Allen Jones, sculptor, was born in Southampton
Ellis Jones, actor, was born in Petersfield
Howard Jones, singer, was born in Southampton
Loftus William Jones, naval commander, was born in Petersfield
Mick Jones, guitarist, was born in Portsmouth
Paul Jones, singer, was born in Portsmouth
Frank Jordan, footballer, was born in Southampton
John Wesley Judd, geologist, was born in Portsmouth
William Judd, cricketer, was born in Bramshaw
Lukas Jutkiewicz, footballer, was born in Southampton

K
Herminie Templeton Kavanagh, novelist, was born in Aldershot
Henry Kay, cricketer, was born in Bedhampton
Robbie Kay, actor, was born in Lymington
Dillie Keane, actor, was born in Portsmouth
Jessie Keane, British author, born in Hampshire
Richard Goodwin Keats, naval commander, was born in Chalton
Joe Keenan, footballer, was born in Southampton
Laura Keene, theatre director, was born in Winchester
Nelson Keene, singer, was born in Farnborough
Frederick Keeping, cyclist, was born in Pennington
Michael Keeping, footballer, was born in Milford on Sea
Martin Kellaway, cricketer, was born in Southampton
Edward Kelsey, actor, was born in Petersfield
John Kempe, politician, was born in Beaulieu
William Kendle, cricketer, was born in Romsey Extra
Derek Kenway, cricketer, was born in Fareham
Richard Kenway, cricketer, was born in Southampton
Paul Kerr, footballer, was born in Portsmouth
Bob Kiddle, footballer, was born in Southampton
Cath Kidston, retail designer, was raised near Andover
Sidney Kimber, politician, was born in Highfield
Arthur Kimish, cricketer, was born in Southampton
Danielle King, cyclist, was born in Southampton
Ernie King, footballer, was born in Southampton
James King, cricketer, was born in Southampton
Clarence Kingsbury, cyclist, was born in Portsmouth
John Kingsmill, politician, was born in King's Enham
Frederick Kitchener, cricketer, was born in Hartley Row
Matthew Kleinveldt, cricketer, was born in Southampton
Philip Klitz, composer, was born in Lymington
Charles Knott, cricketer, was born in Southampton
Roy Koerner, explorer, was born in Copnor
Nicole Koolen, field hockey player, was born in Aldershot

L
Arthur Lake, bishop, was born in Southampton
Kirsopp Lake, theologian, was born in Southampton
Thomas Lake, politician, was born in Southampton
Bruce Lamb, cricketer, was born in Andover
Christopher Lambert, politician, was born in Winchester
Martin Lambert, footballer, was born in Southampton
Oliver Lambert, politician, was born in Southampton
Thomas Lambert, politician, was born in Hazeley
Thomas Lambert, politician, was born in Winchester
Amanda Lamb, broadcaster, was born in Portsmouth
Olly Lancashire, footballer, was born in Basingstoke
James Lancaster, privateer, was born in Basingstoke
Iain Landles, playwright, was born in Portsmouth
Mark Lane, cricket coach, was born in Aldershot
Jason Laney, cricketer, was born in Winchester
George Langdon, cricketer, was born in Winchester
William Langford, cricketer, was born in Hythe
William Lashly, explorer, was born in Hambledon
James Lawrence, cricketer, was born in Portsmouth
Patricia Lawrence, actor, was born in Andover
Alex Lawther, actor, was born in Winchester
Cliff Lazarenko, darts player, was born in Liss
Stephen Leacock, humorist, was born in Swanmore
John Leak, soldier, was born in Portsmouth
Kenneth Leask, pilot, was born in Southsea
Charles Leat, cricketer, was born in Ringwood
Arthur Lee, cricketer, was born in Liphook
Humphrey de Verd Leigh, inventor, was born in Aldershot
Chrystabel Leighton-Porter, model, was born in Eastleigh
Jose Levy, theatre director, was born in Portsmouth
Jona Lewie, singer, was born in Southampton
Phil Lewis, cricketer, was born in Liss
Richard Lewis, cricketer, was born in Winchester
Dave Leworthy, footballer, was born in Portsmouth
Henry Liddon, theologian, was born in North Stoneham
Billy Light, footballer, was born in Woolston
Elisha Light, cricketer, was born in Winchester
William Light, cricketer, was born in Winchester
George Lillycrop, footballer, was born in Gosport
James Lillywhite, cricketer, was born in Tichborne
William Lily, grammarian, was born in Odiham
Kathleen Lindsay, novelist, was born in Aldershot
Edwin Lineham, cricketer, was born in Landport
John Lingard, historian, was born in Winchester
Robert Linzee, naval commander, was born in Portsmouth
Francis Lipscomb, cricketer, was born in New Alresford
William Lipscomb, cricketer, was born in Winchester
Alice Lisle, fugitive shelterer, was born in Ellingham
John Lloyd, politician, was born in Aldershot
Martha Lloyd, recipe collector, was born in Bishopstoke
Nicholas Lloyd, lexicographer, was born in Wonston
Dan Lobb, broadcaster, was born in Colden Common
Herbert Lock, footballer, was born in Southampton
Michael Lockett, soldier, was born in Aldershot
Kathleen Lockhart, actor, was born in Southsea
Christopher Logue, poet, was born in Portsmouth
Henry Long, footballer, was born in Southampton
Selden Long, pilot, was born in Aldershot
Okeover Longcroft, cricketer, was born in Havant
Sue Lopez, footballer, was born in Southampton
Montagu Love, actor, was born in Portsmouth
John Lucarotti, screenwriter, was born in Aldershot
William Lugg, actor, was born in Portsea, Portsmouth
Frederick Luke, soldier, was born in Lockerley
David Lunn-Rockliffe, sports administrator, was raised near Winchester
Algernon Lushington, cricketer, was born in Lyndhurst
Nicholas Lyndhurst, actor, was born in Emsworth
Humphrey Lyons, army commander, was born in St Austins
Richard Lyons, diplomat, was born in Lymington
Tracy Lyons, paedophile, was born in Portsmouth

M
Graham Maby, bass guitarist, was born in Gosport
Angus Macdonald, footballer, was born in Winchester
Marjorie Oludhe Macgoye, novelist, was born in Southampton
Alexander Mackonochie, clergyman, was born in Fareham
Frederic Madden, palaeographer, was born in Portsmouth
Michelle Magorian, novelist, was born in Portsmouth
Sam Magri, footballer, was born in Portsmouth
Dorothy Maijor, consort, was born in Hursley
Alan Mais, surveyor, was born in Southampton
Peregrine Maitland, colonial governor, was born in Longparish
Arthur Malet, actor, was born in Lee on the Solent
Tom Maley, football manager, was born in Portsmouth
Anne-Marie Mallik, actor, was born in Fordingbridge
Simon Mann, mercenary, was born in Aldershot
Herbert Manners, cricketer, was born in Hartley Wintney
Olivia Manning, novelist, was born in Portsmouth
Richard Mant, bishop, was born in Southampton
John Maples, politician, was born in Fareham
Stephen Marcus, actor, was born in Portsmouth
Margaret of York, monarch's daughter, was born in Winchester
Edward Mariner, cricketer, was born in Winchester
Jessie White Mario, nurse, was born in Gosport
Paul Marks, cricketer, was born in Southampton
Laura Marling, singer, was raised in Eversley
George Marshall, footballer, was born in Southampton
Charles Martin, cricketer, was born in Breamore
George Martin, comedian, was born in Aldershot
John Martin, paralympian, was born in Eastleigh
William Martin, cricketer, was born in Southampton
Craig Maskell, footballer, was born in Aldershot
Tom Mason, footballer, was born in Portsmouth
Wally Masur, tennis player, was born in Southampton
Matilda of England, empress, was born in Winchester
Sally Matthews, opera singer, was born in Southampton
Charmian May, actor, was born in Purbrook
John May, cricketer, was born in Southampton
Kieran McAnespie, footballer, was born in Gosport
Caitlin McClatchey, swimmer, was born in Portsmouth
Neil McCorkell, cricketer, was born in Portsmouth
Dennis McDermott, trade unionist, was born in Portsmouth
Ian McEwan, novelist, was born in Aldershot
Charlie McGibbon, footballer, was born in Portsmouth
Doug McGibbon, footballer, was born in Netley
Richard McIlwaine, cricketer, was born in Milton
Arthur McIntyre, cricketer, was born in Hartley Wintney
Stephen McKay, academic, was born in Aldershot 
Ian McNeice, actor, was born in Basingstoke
Josh McQuoid, footballer, was born in Southampton
George Meredith, novelist, was born in Portsmouth
Sammy Meston, footballer, was born in Southampton
Jeremy Metcalfe, racing driver, was born in Fleet
Daniel Middleton, YouTube personality and professional gamer, was born in Aldershot
Steve Middleton, footballer, was born in Portsmouth
Tony Middleton, cricketer, was born in Winchester
Ian Mikardo, politician, was born in Portsmouth
John Everett Millais, painter, was born in Southampton
Roger Miller, cricketer, was born in Southampton
Frank Milligan, cricketer, was born in Farnborough
Brusher Mills, snake-catcher, was born in Emery Down
Heather Mills, charity campaigner, was born in Aldershot
Scott Mills, broadcaster, was born in Eastleigh
Steve Mills, footballer, was born in Portsmouth
Ralph Milner, martyr, was born in Slackstead
Henry Misselbrook, cricketer, was born in Otterbourne
Mary Russell Mitford, author, was born in New Alresford
John Moberly, cricketer, was born in Winchester
Bob Moffat, footballer, was born in Portsmouth
Harry Moger, footballer, was born in Southampton
George Monger, soldier, was born in Woodmancott
Santa Montefiore, novelist, was born in Winchester
Edwin Moon, pilot, was born in Southampton
Liam Mooney, entrepreneur, was born in Gosport
John Moore, cricketer, was born in Winchfield
Rob Moore, field hockey player, was born in Winchester
Richie Moran, footballer, was raised in Gosport
Aubrey Morris, actor, was born in Portsmouth
Paul Morris, academic, was born in Southampton
Sarah Jane Morris, singer, was born in Southampton
Talwin Morris, illustrator, was born in Winchester
Wolfe Morris, actor, was born in Portsmouth
James Morrison, politician, was born in Middle Wallop
John Mortimore, football manager, was born in Farnborough
Neil Moss, footballer, was born in New Milton
Olly Moss, graphic designer, was born in Winchester
Mickie Most, music producer, was born in Aldershot
Fred Mouncher, footballer, was born in Southampton
Edwina Mountbatten, socialite, was born in Romsey Extra
Dominic Muldowney, composer, was born in Southampton
Albert Mundy, footballer, was born in Gosport
John Murray, religious minister, was born in Alton
Rosemary Murray, university vice-chancellor, was born in Havant
Paul Musselwhite, footballer, was born in Portsmouth

N
Ñāṇavīra Thera, monk, was born in Aldershot
Frank Neary, footballer, was born in Aldershot
Tiff Needell, racing driver, was born in Havant
Jan Needle, novelist, was born in Portsmouth
James Newcome, bishop, was born in Aldershot
Jack Newman, cricketer, was born in Southsea
Ron Newman, footballer, was born in Fareham
Tony Newman, drummer, was born in Southampton
Edward Newton, cricketer, was born in Blackmoor
Paul Newton, bass guitarist, was born in Andover
David Nicholls, novelist, was born in Eastleigh
William Graham Nicholson, politician, was raised in Froxfield
Donald Nicol, academic, was born in Portsmouth
Florence Nightingale, lived at Embley Park, buried at St Margaret's Church, East Wellow.
Arthur Nineham, footballer, was born in Southampton
Victor Norbury, cricketer, was born in Bartley
Lee Nurse, cricketer, was born in Basingstoke
Colin Nutley, film director, was born in Gosport
John Nyren, cricketer, was born in Hambledon

O
David Oakes, actor, was born in Fordingbridge
Tony Oakey, boxer, was born in Portsmouth
Joe Oastler, footballer, was born in Portsmouth
James Ockendon, soldier, was born in Portsmouth
Christian O'Connell, broadcaster, was born in Winchester
Tom Oliver, actor, was born in Fareham
Andrew O'Neill, comedian, was born in Portsmouth
Michael O'Neill, poet, was born in Aldershot
Thomas Frederick Onslow, cricketer, was born in Old Alresford
Paul O'Prey, author, was born in Southampton
Martin Orford, keyboard player, was born in Southampton
Peter Orton, television producer, was born in Portsmouth
Roland Orzabal, singer, was born in Portsmouth
Harry Osman, footballer, was born in Bentworth
Mike Osman, broadcaster, was born in Millbrook
Alison Owen, film producer, was born in Portsmouth
Alex Oxlade-Chamberlain, footballer, was born in Portsmouth

P
Marlon Pack, footballer, was born in Portsmouth
Chris Packham, naturalist, was born in Southampton
Bert Paddington, footballer, was born in Bishopstoke
Jonathan Page, footballer, was born in Portsmouth
Martin Page, singer, was born in Southampton
James Paine, architect, was born in Andover
Terry Paine, footballer, was born in Winchester
Garrick Palmer, wood engraver, was born in Portsmouth
Rodney Palmer, cricketer, was born in Sherfield on Loddon
Tara Palmer-Tomkinson, socialite, was raised in Dummer
William Paris, cricketer, was born in Old Alresford
John Parker, cricketer, was born in Portsmouth
Tom Parker, footballer, was born in Woolston
Bruce Parry, explorer, was born in Hythe
Vivienne Parry, journalist, was born in Portsmouth
Tony Parsons, journalist, was born in Gosport
Joe Partington, footballer, was born in Portsmouth
David M Partner, photographer, was born in Winchester
Alfred Parvin, cricketer, was born in Southampton
Alan Pascoe, athlete, was born in Portsmouth
Marcus Patric, actor, was born in Portsmouth
Josh Payne, footballer, was born in Basingstoke
John Paynter, pilot, was born in Southsea
Stanley Pearce, cricketer, was born in Totton
Walter Pearce, cricketer, was born in Bassett
Iain Percy, yachtsman, was born in Southampton
Mark Perego, rugby union player, was born in Winchester
Russell Perrett, footballer, was born in Barton on Sea
Andrew Perry, cricketer, was born in Portsmouth
Brian Perry, ice hockey player, was born in Aldershot
Seamus Perry, academic, was born in Aldershot 
Henry Persse, cricketer, was born in Portswood
John Pestell, colonial official, was raised in Portsmouth
Dorothy Peto, police officer, was born in Emery Down
William Petty, economist, was born in Romsey
Edmund Phipps-Hornby, army officer, was born in Emsworth
Stuart Piggott, archaeologist, was born in Petersfield
Hew Pike, army commander, was born in Bentley
Thelwell Pike, footballer, was born in Andover
Lucy Pinder, model, was born in Winchester
Robert Pink, academic, was born in Kempshott
Katie Piper, charity campaigner, was born in Andover
Raymond Pitman, cricketer, was born in Bartley
John Pitts, religious scholar, was born in Alton
Roy Player, footballer, was born in Portsmouth
William Plowden, politician, was raised in Basingstoke
William Ponting, footballer, was born in Andover
Peter Pook, novelist, was raised in Southsea
Joseph Ellison Portlock, geologist, was born in Gosport
Arthur Pothecary, cricketer, was born in Southampton
Sidney Pothecary, cricketer, was born in Southampton
Ken Pound, footballer, was born in Portsmouth
Thomas Pounde, religious brother, was born in Farlington
John Pounds, teacher, was born in Portsmouth
Budge Pountney, rugby union player, was born in Southampton
Reg Presley, singer, was born in Andover
Kevin Pressman, footballer, was born in Fareham
James Charles Prevost, naval commander, was born in Bedhampton
Alan Priddy, sailor and adventurer, was born and raised in Portsmouth
Albert Prince-Cox, football manager, was born in Southsea
Jason Prior, footballer, was born in Portsmouth
Edward William Pritchard, murderer, was born in Southsea
Lawrence Prittipaul, cricketer, was born in Portsmouth
Ralph Prouton, cricketer, was born in Southampton
David Puckett, footballer, was born in Southampton
Sidney Pullen, footballer, was born in Southampton
Richard Purchase, cricketer, was born in Liss
George Puttenham, literary critic, was born in Sherfield on Loddon
Patrick Pye, sculptor, was born in Winchester

Q

R
Mark Raffety, actor, was born in Portsmouth
John Ralfs, botanist, was born in Millbrook
Cyril Raikes, pilot, was born in Swanmore
Joe Ralls, footballer, was born in Aldershot
George Randell, politician, was born in New Milton
Umer Rashid, cricketer, was born in Southampton
Bill Rawlings, footballer, was born in Andover
John Frederick Peel Rawlinson, politician, was born in New Alresford
Robert Raynbird, cricketer, was born in Laverstoke
Walter Raynbird, cricketer, was born in Basing
Ernest Read, cricketer, was born in Portsmouth
Richard Reade, judge, was born in Nether Wallop
Jamie Redknapp, footballer, was born in Barton on Sea
Barry Reed, cricketer, was born in Southsea
Libby Rees, author, was born in Ringwood
Kevin Reeves, footballer, was born in Burley
Thomas Reeves, sailor, was born in Portsmouth
Alex Reid, kickboxer, was born in Aldershot
Reinald av Stavanger, bishop, was born in Winchester
Thomas Rennell, theologian, was born in Winchester
Reg Revans, management consultant, was born in Portsmouth
Edward Reynolds, bishop, was born in Southampton
John Russell Reynolds, neurologist, was born in Romsey
Kurt Reynolds, ice hockey player, was born in Basingstoke
 Rex Orange County (Alexander O’Connor), recording artist, was born in Grayshott
John Rice, cricketer, was born in Chandler's Ford
Richard of Cornwall, monarch, was born in Winchester
Bob Richards, cricketer, was born in Winchester
Cyril Richards, cricketer, was born in Andover
Peter Richards, rugby union player, was born in Portsmouth
Charles Ridding, cricketer, was born in Winchester
William Ridding, cricketer, was born in Winchester
Alfred Ridley, cricketer, was born in East Woodhay
Derek Riggs, painter, was born in Portsmouth
Les Riggs, footballer, was born in Portsmouth
Bruce Rioch, football manager, was born in Aldershot
James Riordan, novelist, was born in Portsmouth
Michael Ripper, actor, was born in Portsmouth
Matt Ritchie, footballer, was born in Gosport
Dave Roberts, footballer, was born in Southampton
Graham Roberts, footballer, was born in Southampton
Edward Robinson, sailor, was born in Portsea, Portsmouth
David Rock, cricketer, was born in Southsea
Nick Rogers, yachtsman, was born in Lymington
Paul Rogers, footballer, was born in Portsmouth
Albie Roles, footballer, was born in Southampton
Tony Rolt, racing driver, was born in Bordon
Graham Roope, cricketer, was born in Fareham
Don Roper, footballer, was born in Botley
Alec Rose, yachtsman, was born in Portsmouth
Jordan Rose, footballer, was born in Southampton
Stuart Rose, businessman, was born in Gosport
Stella Ross-Craig, illustrator, was born in Aldershot
Jonathan Routh, broadcaster, was born in Gosport
Eddie Rowles, footballer, was born in Gosport
Susanna Rowson, novelist, was born in Portsmouth
Benjamin Rudyerd, politician, was born in Hartley Wintney
Ralph Ruffell, footballer, was born in Southampton
Mary Rundle, naval superintendent, was born in Swaythling
John Russell, art critic, was born in Fleet
Ken Russell, film director, was born in Southampton
Kevin Russell, footballer, was born in Paulsgrove
Mary Russell, pilot, was born in Stockbridge
Stuart J. Russell, computer scientist, was born in Portsmouth
Arnold Rutherford, cricketer, was born in Highclere

S
George Saintsbury, literary historian, was born in Southampton
John Salew, actor, was born in Portsmouth
Guy Salisbury-Jones, vintner, was born in Hambledon
Nowell Salmon, naval commander, was born in Swarraton
Jock Salter, footballer, was born in Bitterne
Lee Sandford, footballer, was born in Basingstoke
William Sandys, diplomat, was born in Sherborne St John
Charles Roscoe Savage, photographer, was born in Southampton
Robert Savage, cricketer, was born in Southampton
Michael Scammell, biographer, was born in Lyndhurst
William Scammell, poet, was born in Southampton
Jon Schofield, canoeist, was born in Petersfield
Rachel Schofield, journalist, was born in Winchester
Philip Sclater, zoologist, was born in Wootton St Lawrence
Charles Kennedy Scott, organist, was born in Romsey
Edwin Scott, footballer, was born in Portsmouth
Matthew Scott, cricketer, was born in Portsmouth
Bert Scriven, footballer, was born in Winsor
Margaret Scudamore, actor, was born in Portsmouth
Hugh Seagrim, soldier, was born in Ashmansworth
Alfred Seal, cricketer, was born in Millbrook
Ron Searle, politician, was born in Southampton
Luke Sears, cricketer, was born in Portsmouth
William Sedgwick, bishop, was born in Freemantle
Peter Sellers, actor, was born in Southsea
James Alexander Seton, duellist, was born in Fordingbridge
Samuel Sewall, judge, was born in Bishopstoke
Katy Sexton, swimmer, was born in Portsmouth
Charles Seymour, cricketer, was born in Winchfield
Clive Shakespeare, guitarist, was born in Southampton
John Sharpe, footballer, was born in Portsmouth
John Shearman, art historian, was born in Aldershot
Edgar Sheldrake, cricketer, was born in Aldershot
Bert Shelley, footballer, was born in Romsey
George Shenton, pharmacist, was born in Winchester
Beatrice Shilling, aeronautical engineer, was born in Waterlooville
Aaron Shingler, rugby union player, was born in Aldershot
Lowri Shone, ballet dancer, was born in Winchester
Ray Shulman, bass guitarist, was born in Portsmouth
John Sillett, football manager, was born in Southampton
Peter Sillett, footballer, was born in Southampton
Tim Sills, footballer, was born in Romsey
Andrew Simmons, wrestler, was born in Liss
Terry Simpson, footballer, was born in Southampton
Richard Skinner, broadcaster, was born in Portsmouth
Donald Slade, footballer, was born in Southampton
Harry Slater, politician, was born in Portsmouth
Mark Sloan, wrestler, was born in Portsmouth
Henry Small, footballer, was born in Southampton
Kathy Smallwood-Cook, athlete, was born in Winchester
Andy Smart, comedian, was born in Southsea
David Smith, boccia player, was born in Eastleigh
Digby Smith, military historian, was born in Aldershot
George Smith, footballer, was born in Portsmouth
George D. W. Smith, materials scientist, was born in Aldershot
Hugh Smith, cricketer, was born in Lasham
John Derek Smith, biologist, was born in Southampton
Jolyon Brettingham Smith, composer, was born in Southampton
Sarah Smith, singer, was raised in Widley
Sean Smith, singer, was raised in Widley
Sydney Philip Smith, pilot, was born in Aldershot
Victor Smith, footballer, was born in Southampton
George Smoker, cricketer, was born in Ovington
Henry Smoker, cricketer, was born in Hinton Ampner
Martin Snape, painter, was born in Gosport
Steve Snell, cricketer, was born in Winchester
Thomas D'Oyly Snow, army commander, was born in Newton Valence
Tom Solesbury, rower, was born in Farnborough
Clare Solomon, politician, was born in Winchester
Caroline Anne Southey, poet, was born in Buckland
Nigel Spackman, footballer, was born in Romsey
Adolphus Sparrow, cricketer, was born in Alverstoke
Lee Spencer, keyboard player, was born in Emsworth
Joshua Spencer-Smith, cricketer, was born in Fareham
Orlando Spencer-Smith, cricketer, was born in Fareham
Tim Spicer, arms dealer, was born in Aldershot
Isaac Spratt, toy dealer, was born in Ibsley
William Spry, army commander, was born in Titchfield
Lisbee Stainton, singer, was raised in Basingstoke
Lorraine Stanley, actor, was born in Portsmouth
Len Stansbridge, footballer, was born in Southampton
Bill Stead, footballer, was born in Portsea, Portsmouth
Robert Steadman, composer, was raised in Basingstoke
Anne Steele, hymnwriter, was born in Broughton
David Steele, cricketer, was born in Southampton
Catharni Stern, sculptor, was born in Southsea
Herbert Stewart, army commander, was born in Sparsholt
Kris Stewart, football executive, was born in Portsmouth
William Stewart, cricketer, was born in Sparsholt
Brian Stock, footballer, was born in Winchester
Julian Stockwin, novelist, was born in Basingstoke
Bobby Stokes, footballer, was born in Portsmouth
Mitchell Stokes, cricketer, was born in Basingstoke
John Stonehouse, politician, was born in Southampton
Mike Stowell, footballer, was born in Portsmouth
John Straffen, murderer, was born in Bordon
Gary Streeter, politician, was born in Gosport
David Stride, footballer, was born in Lymington
William Strugnell, pilot, was born in Southampton
Clive Strutt, composer, was born in Aldershot
Rob Styles, football referee, was born in Waterlooville
Murray Sueter, naval commander, was born in Alverstoke
George Summerbee, footballer, was born in Winchester
Sarah Sutton, actor, was born in Basingstoke
John Sydenham, footballer, was born in Southampton
Peter Symonds, merchant, was born in Winchester
Kit Symons, footballer, was born in Basingstoke

T
Basil Talbot, cricketer, was born in Southsea
Charles Tannock, politician, was born in Aldershot
Bradley Tarbuck, footballer, was born in Emsworth
Walter George Tarrant, builder, was born in Gosport
Edward Tate, cricketer, was born in Lyndhurst
Frederick Tate, cricketer, was born in Lyndhurst
Henry Tate, cricketer, was born in Lyndhurst
Saint Cyprian Tayler, pilot, was born in Winchester
Billy Taylor, cricketer, was born in Southampton
George Taylor, cricketer, was born in Havant
James Taylor, cricketer, was born in Southampton
Kerrie Taylor, actor, was born in Romsey
Peter Taylor, film editor, was born in Portsmouth
Scott Taylor, footballer, was born in Portsmouth
Thomas William Taylor, politician, was born in Portsmouth
Walter Taylor, wooden block maker, was born in Southampton
Suzie Templeton, animator, was raised in Highfield
Sean Terry, cricketer, was born in Southampton
Caryl Thain, cricketer, was born in Catherington
William Thoburn, politician, was born in Portsmouth
Mary Thomas, diarist, was born in Southampton
Des Thompson, footballer, was born in Southampton
Edward Thomson, bishop, was born in Portsea, Portsmouth
Henry Thomson, painter, was born in Portsea, Portsmouth
Jake Thomson, footballer, was born in Portsmouth
Robert Thorne, cricketer, was born in Southampton
Philip Thresher, cricketer, was born in Hamble le Rice
Henry Thurston, coachman, was born in Brockenhurst
Chidiock Tichborne, poet, was born in Southampton
Nicholas Tichborne, martyr, was born in Hartley Mauditt
Thomas Tichborne, martyr, was born in Hartley Mauditt
Annabel Tiffin, journalist, was born in Southampton
Tanita Tikaram, singer, was raised in Basingstoke
Brian Timms, cricketer, was born in Ropley
Mark Tinley, music producer, was born in Lymington
Robert Titherley, racing driver, was born in East Tytherley
Edward Tolfree, cricketer, was born in Southampton
James Tomlinson, cricketer, was born in Winchester
Alfred Maurice Toye, soldier, was born in Aldershot
Edward Robert Tregear, linguist, was born in Southampton
Chris Tremlett, cricketer, was born in Southampton
Arthur Trollope, cricketer, was born in Eling
Richard Trowbridge, naval commander, was born in Andover
Sampson Tubb, cricketer, was born in Broughton
James Tuck, cricketer, was born in Ringwood
William Tucker, trader, was born in Portsea, Portsmouth
Arthur Tudor, prince, was born in Winchester
Derek Tulk, cricketer, was born in Southampton
Archie Turner, footballer, was born in Hartley Wintney
Fred Turner, footballer, was born in Southampton
Frank Turner, singer/songwriter, born in Meonstoke
Hanson Victor Turner, soldier, was born in Andover
Harry Turner, footballer, was born in Farnborough
Ian Turner, cricketer, was born in Denmead
Wayne Turner, kickboxer, was born in Aldershot
John Tutchin, journalist, was born in Lymington
John Twyne, politician, was born in Bullington

U
George Ubsdell, cricketer, was born in Southampton
Shaun Udal, cricketer, was born in Cove
George Underdown, cricketer, was born in Petersfield
Arthur Upfield, novelist, was born in Gosport
Richard Utley, cricketer, was born in Havant

V
Henry Valder, sawmiller, was born in Southampton
Geoffrey van Orden, politician, was born in Waterlooville
Bobby Veck, footballer, was born in Titchfield
Adela Verne, pianist, was born in Southampton
Mathilde Verne, pianist, was born in Southampton
Mike Vickers, guitarist, was born in Southampton
Paul Vigay, computer consultant, was raised in Waterloovlle
Peter Viggers, politician, was born in Gosport
Rowan Vine, footballer, was born in Basingstoke
Pelham von Donop, footballer, was born in Southsea

W
James Wade, darts player, was born in Aldershot
Alan Waldron, cricketer, was born in Southsea
Malcolm Waldron, footballer, was born in Emsworth
Henry Wallop, politician, was born in Farleigh Wallop
Henry Wallop, politician, was born in Farleigh Wallop
John Wallop, diplomat, was born in Farleigh Wallop
Brian Walsh, footballer, was born in Aldershot
Joel Ward, footballer, was born in Emsworth
John Ward, politician, was raised in Appleshaw
William Warham, archbishop, was born in Malshanger
Elijah Waring, writer, was born in Alton
Betty Warren, actor, was born in Fareham
Samantha Warriner, triathlete, was born in Alton
Thomas Warton, poet, was born in Basingstoke
Derek Warwick, racing driver, was born in New Alresford
Paul Warwick, racing driver, was born in New Alresford
Alan Wassell, cricketer, was born in Fareham
Aeone Victoria Watson, singer, was born in Liss
Giz Watson, politician, was born in Eastleigh
Tom Watson, kickboxer, was born in Southampton
Alfred Watts, cricketer, was born in Millbrook
Isaac Watts, hymnwriter, was born in Southampton
David Weir, footballer, was born in Aldershot
Daniel Welch, racing driver, was born in Aldershot
James Welch, soldier, was born in Stratfield Saye
Dan Wells, racing driver, was born in Southampton
Jerold Wells, actor, was born in Wallington
Swithun Wells, martyr, was born in Brambridge
Alfred John West, photographer, was born in Gosport
Francis West, colonial governor, was raised in Wherwell
John West, colonial governor, was born in Testwood
Thomas West, privy councillor, was born in Wherwell
John Portsmouth Football Club Westwood, renowned football supporter, was born in Liss
Alf Wheeler, footballer, was born in Fareham
William Whitcher, cricketer, was born in Emsworth
Gary White, football manager, was born in Southampton
Gilbert White, naturalist, was born in Selborne
Jamie White, footballer, was born in Southampton
Peter White, journalist, was born in Winchester
Thomas White, cricketer, was born in Basingstoke
Edward Whitehead, advertising mascot, was born in Aldershot
William Whiting, footballer, was born in Southampton
George Byrom Whittaker, publisher, was born in Southampton
Tom Whittaker, football manager, was born in Aldershot
Mabel Wickham, painter, was born in Fleet
Tom Wild, cricketer, was born in Southampton
Gabriella Wilde, actor, was born in Basingstoke
Len Wilkins, footballer, was born in Southampton
Chris Wilkinson, tennis player, was born in Southampton
Maurice Wilks, automotive engineer, was born in Hayling Island
Edmund Willes, cricketer, was born in Dibden Purlieu
William of Wykeham, bishop, was born in Wickham
Christine Williams, model, was born in Basingstoke
David Williams, academic, was born in Lasham
George Williams, cricketer, was born in Aldershot
James Williams, bishop, was born in Overton
Ursula Moray Williams, novelist, was born in Petersfield
James G. Willie, missionary, was born in Murrell Green
Joseph Willoughby, cricketer, was born in Aldershot
Pippa Wilson, yachtswoman, was born in Southampton
Paul Wimbleton, footballer, was born in Havant
Dave Winfield, footballer, was born in Aldershot
Pete Wingfield, singer, was born in Liphook
George Winter, painter, was born in Portsea, Portsmouth
Donald Wiseman, archaeologist, was born in Emsworth
George Wither, poet, was born in Bentworth
Ted Withers, footballer, was born in Ower
William Withers, settler, was born in Portsmouth
Arthur Wood, cricketer, was born in Bentworth
Arthur Wood, footballer, was born in Southampton
Chris Wood, cricketer, was born in Basingstoke
Julian Wood, cricketer, was born in Winchester
Ross Wood, cricket umpire, was born in Basingstoke
Kim Woodburn, cleaner, was born in Portsmouth
John Woodcock, journalist, was born in Longparish
George Woodford, footballer, was born in Lymington
Charles Woodmason (ca. 1720-1789), Anglican clergyman and apologist, American loyalist, leader of the South Carolina Regulator Movement.  Also, a published poet, musical editor, and responsible for the Handel organ being moved from Canongate to Holy Trinity Church, Gosport
Harry Ellis Wooldridge, musical antiquary, was born in Winchester
Ian Wooldridge, journalist, was born in New Milton
Janet Wright, British-Canadian actress (1945-2016), was born in Farnhorough
David Wynne, sculptor, was born in Lyndhurst

X

Y
Charles Yaldren, cricketer, was born in Southampton
Christopher Yates, cricketer, was born in Aldershot
Frances Yates, historian, was born in Southsea
Peter Yates, film director, was born in Aldershot
Joanna Yeates, murder victim, was raised in Ampfield
James Lucas Yeo, naval commander, was born in Southampton
Harry Yeomans, footballer, was born in Farnborough
Charlotte Mary Yonge, novelist, was born in Otterbourne
Charles Yorke, naval commander, was born in Hamble le Rice
Arthur Young, police commissioner, was born in Eastleigh
Bob Young, songwriter, was born in Basingstoke

 
Hampshire